Power and Pain is the debut album by American thrash metal band Whiplash. It was released in 1986 via Roadrunner Records and was followed up by 1987's Ticket to Mayhem.

In 1998, Displeased Records rereleased Power and Pain, which included their second album, Ticket to Mayhem.

The album features members of New York City bands, Carnivore and Agnostic Front, on backing vocals.

Track listing
All songs written by Tony Portaro. except where noted.

Credits
 Tony Portaro – vocals, guitar
 Tony Bono – bass
 Tony Scaglione – drums
 Peter Steele and Louie Beateaux (Carnivore) – backing vocals
 Vinnie Stigma and Rob Kabula (Agnostic Front) – backing vocals
 Recorded at Systems II, Brooklyn, New York
 Produced by Norman Dunn
 Engineered by Michael Marciano

References

External links
Roadrunner Records band page
BNR Metal discography page
Encyclopaedia Metallum album entry
Displeased Records band page

1986 debut albums
Whiplash (band) albums
Roadrunner Records albums